The 1950 Boston Braves season was the 80th season of the franchise.  During the season, Sam Jethroe became the first black player in the history of the Braves.

Offseason 
 December 5, 1949: Phil Paine was selected by the Braves from the Philadelphia Phillies in the minor league draft.
 December 14, 1949: Eddie Stanky and Alvin Dark were traded by the Braves to the New York Giants for Sid Gordon, Buddy Kerr, Willard Marshall, and Red Webb.
 Prior to 1950 season: Art Fowler was acquired by the Braves from the Atlanta Crackers.

Regular season

Season standings

Record vs. opponents

Roster

Player stats

Batting

Starters by position 
Note: Pos = Position; G = Games played; AB = At bats; H = Hits; Avg. = Batting average; HR = Home runs; RBI = Runs batted in

Other batters 
Note: G = Games played; AB = At bats; H = Hits; Avg. = Batting average; HR = Home runs; RBI = Runs batted in

Pitching

Starting pitchers 
Note: G = Games pitched; IP = Innings pitched; W = Wins; L = Losses; ERA = Earned run average; SO = Strikeouts

Other pitchers 
Note: G = Games pitched; IP = Innings pitched; W = Wins; L = Losses; ERA = Earned run average; SO = Strikeouts

Relief pitchers 
Note: G = Games pitched; W = Wins; L = Losses; SV = Saves; ERA = Earned run average; SO = Strikeouts

Farm system

References

External links
1950 Boston Braves season at Baseball Reference

Boston Braves seasons
Boston Braves
Boston Braves
1950s in Boston